Xavier Tyron Sneed (born December 21, 1997) is an American professional basketball player for the Greensboro Swarm of the NBA G League. He played college basketball for the Kansas State Wildcats.

High school career

Born in Alabama,  Sneed attended Hazelwood Central High School where he helped the Hawks reach a 70–18 record during his final three seasons, which included at least 23 wins each year and a 5–0 mark in conference play in the 2015–16 season. He committed to playing college basketball for Kansas State over offers from Illinois and Xavier. In 2016, he was a consensus Top 160 prospect by most recruiting services, ranking No. 93 by Rivals and No. 152 by 247Sports.

College career
Sneed played college basketball for Kansas State, where he appeared in 137 contests, which included 32 games as a senior. That year, he averaged 14.2 points, 4.8 rebounds, 1.8 steals and 1.7 assists in 32.5 minutes per game, earning an All-Big 12 honorable mention.

Professional career

Greensboro Swarm (2021)
After going undrafted in the 2020 NBA draft, Sneed signed on November 30, 2020, an Exhibit 10 deal with the Charlotte Hornets and was waived on December 19 after three preseason appearances.

On January 27, 2021, he signed as an affiliate player with the Greensboro Swarm of the NBA G League and averaged 8.1 points, 4 rebounds and 1.8 steals in 13 games.

Niagara River Lions (2021)
On April 7, 2021, Sneed signed with the Niagara River Lions of the Canadian Elite Basketball League where he averaged 17.8 points, 4.7 rebounds, 2.4 assists and 1.6 steals.

Return to the Swarm / Memphis Grizzlies (2021–2022)
On September 20, 2021, Sneed signed another deal with the Hornets. However, he was waived on October 8. On October 24, he re-signed with the Greensboro Swarm. Sneed averaged 10 points, 4 rebounds, 1.6 assists and 1.9 steals per game.

On December 27, 2021, Sneed signed a 10-day contract with the Memphis Grizzlies. After the contract expired, he re-joined the Swarm.

Utah Jazz (2022)
On February 16, 2022, Sneed signed a two-way contract with the Utah Jazz. He was waived by the Jazz on September 16.

Third stint with the Swarm (2022–present)
On November 4, 2022, Sneed was named to the opening night roster for the Greensboro Swarm.

Career statistics

NBA

|-
| style="text-align:left;"| 
| style="text-align:left;"| Memphis
| 2 || 0 || 4.0 || .000 || .000 || — || 1.0 || .0 || .0 || .0 || .0
|-
| style="text-align:left;"| 
| style="text-align:left;"| Utah
| 7 || 0 || 4.4 || .250 || .167 || — || .6 || .1 || .0 || .0 || .7
|- class="sortbottom"
| style="text-align:center;" colspan="2"| Career
| 9 || 0 || 4.3 || .200 || .125 || — || .7 || .1 || .0 || .0 || .6

College

|-
| style="text-align:left;"| 2016–17
| style="text-align:left;"| Kansas State
| 35 || 2 || 18.3 || .429 || .339 || .726 || 2.6 || .6 || .9 || .2 || 7.1
|-
| style="text-align:left;"| 2017–18 
| style="text-align:left;"| Kansas State
| 37 || 37 || 31.4 || .417 || .344 || .739 || 5.1 || 1.8 || 1.6 || .3 || 11.1
|-
| style="text-align:left;"| 2018–19 
| style="text-align:left;"| Kansas State 
| 33 || 33 || 30.7 || .396 || .346 || .670 || 5.5 || 1.9 || 1.4 || .3 || 10.6
|-
| style="text-align:left;"| 2019–20
| style="text-align:left;"| Kansas State
| 32 || 32 || 32.5 || .365 || .304 || .690 || 4.8 || 1.7 || 1.8 || .3 || 14.2
|- class="sortbottom"
| style="text-align:center;" colspan="2"| Career
| 137 || 104 || 28.1 || .397 || .332 || .703 || 4.5 || 1.5 || 1.4 || .3 || 10.7

Personal life
He is the son of Anthonie and Erica Sneed and has a younger sister, Ania. He earned a degree in organizational management in May 2020.

References

External links
Kansas State Wildcats bio

1997 births
Living people
American expatriate basketball people in Canada
American men's basketball players
Basketball players from St. Louis
Greensboro Swarm players
Kansas State Wildcats men's basketball players
Memphis Grizzlies players
Niagara River Lions players
Small forwards
Undrafted National Basketball Association players
Utah Jazz players